Max Kämper (born December 16, 1879 in Jüterbog, † November 10, 1916 at Sailly-Saillisel) was a German mining engineer.

His 1908 survey and map of Mammoth Cave, Kentucky, assisted by cave guide Ed Bishop, represent the first accurate instrumental survey of portions of the cave system. Kämper arrived at Mammoth Cave in 1908 and left 8 months later in 1909.

Kämper was killed in trench warfare at the Somme River in north-eastern France, on November 10, 1916, during the closing days of the Battle of the Somme. He is buried in the War Cemetery of Cambrai near Arras, France.

References

External links

Max Kämper and the Mammoth Cave Connection – (English and German) describes the search for and discovery of Max Kaemper's identity.
Max Kämper's genealogy - With pictures and soundtracks about his story as well as his genealogy (English and German)

1879 births
1916 deaths
Cavers
Engineers from Brandenburg
German military personnel killed in World War I
German mining engineers
Mammoth Cave National Park
People from Jüterbog
20th-century German engineers
German Army personnel of World War I